OJS may mean:

 O. J. Simpson (born 1947)
 Open Journal Systems, journal publishing software
 ISO 639 language designation for the Oji-Cree language, also known as the Severn Ojibwa language or Anishininiimowin (Anishinini language)